Ciel 2 (NORAD 33453) is a commercial broadcast communications satellite owned by Canadian Ciel Satellite Group. It was launched on December 10, 2008 from Baikonur Cosmodrome in Kazakhstan by an ILS Proton-M/Breeze-M vehicle. The satellite is built by Thales Alenia Space and is based on Spacebus-4000C4 bus. It is the largest Spacebus class satellite built to date (5561 kg). Operating from 129° West geostationary orbit position, its 32 Ku band transponders will deliver high-definition and other TV services throughout North America. The satellite delivers multiple independent spot beams in Ku band.

Dish Network has decided to spot beam local affiliates of major networks instead of offering them on CONUS as was previously done on Echostar 5.

References

External links
 ILS website mission control
 Ciel-2 footprints at Satbeams

SES satellites
Communications satellites in geostationary orbit
Spacecraft launched in 2008
Satellites using the Spacebus bus